"Just as I Am" is a song by American singer-songwriter Rob Hegel. It was co-written with Dick Wagner, and was released as a single in 1982. The song was covered three years later by English-Australian soft rock duo Air Supply from their eighth studio and second eponymous album, Air Supply.

Rob Hegel's original version
"Just as I Am" is a ballad written by Hegel and Dick Wagner in 1982 and released as a non-album single which failed to chart. It was covered three years later by English-Australian duo Air Supply and became a top 20 hit.

Air Supply version

In May 1985, English-Australian soft rock duo Air Supply covered the song which was released as the lead single from their second eponymous and eighth studio album Air Supply (1985). It became a top 20 hit on the Billboard Hot 100.

Chart performance
"Just as I Am" peaked at No. 19 on the Billboard Hot 100, and No. 3 on the Adult Contemporary chart. It was to be Air Supply's last top 40 hit on the Billboard Hot 100. The song also reached No. 12 on the Canadian RPM singles chart, and No. 9 on its Adult Contemporary chart. In Australia, the song peaked at No. 79.

Track listing
U.S. 7" single
A. "Just as I Am" - 4:31
B. "Crazy Love" - 3:58

UK 12" single
A1. "Just as I Am"
A2. "All Out of Love"
B1. "Crazy Love"
B2. "Lost in Love"
B3. "Even the Nights Are Better"

References

1982 songs
1982 singles
1985 singles
Air Supply songs
Songs written by Dick Wagner
Songs written by Rob Hegel
Song recordings produced by Bob Ezrin
Arista Records singles
Mercury Records singles
1980s ballads
Rock ballads